The Cadbury family is a wealthy British family of Quaker industrialists descending from Richard Tapper Cadbury.

 Richard Tapper Cadbury (1768–1860) draper and abolitionist, who financed his sons' start-up business
John Cadbury (1801–1889), Quaker, family patriarch and founder of the Cadbury chocolate company working with two brothers; married Candia Barrow
Richard Cadbury (1835–1899), manufacturer and philanthropist; married Elizabeth Adlington
Barrow Cadbury (1862–1958), head of the chocolate factory, founder of the Barrow Cadbury Trust; married Geraldine Cadbury
Dorothy Adlington Cadbury (1892–1987), director of Cadbury and botanist. Her name appears on the side of tubs of Cadbury Roses chocolates.
Paul Cadbury (1895–1984), chair of the Barrow Cadbury Trust from 1958 until his death in 1984
Charles Lloyd Cadbury (1926–2000), director of Barrow Cadbury Fund from 1992 until his death
Ruth Margaret Cadbury (born 1959), Labour Member of Parliament for Brentford & Isleworth constituency since 2015
 William Adlington Cadbury (1867–1957); married Emmeline Hannah Wilson
 George Corbyn Barrow (1903–1998), lawyer and Lord Mayor of Birmingham
 George Cadbury (1839–1922), younger brother, developed the firm; married Mary Tylor
 Edward Cadbury, (1873–1948), head of the chocolate factory, founder of the Edward Cadbury Charitable Trust
 George Cadbury Jr (1878–1954), chairman of Cadbury, developed the recipe for Cadbury Dairy Milk.
 Marion Cadbury (1894–1979); married William Greeves (1890–1960)
 Laurence John Cadbury (1889–1982), succeeded his brother Edward as head of the chocolate company in 1944
 Sir Adrian Hayhurst Cadbury (1929–2015), chairman of Cadbury and Cadbury Schweppes for 24 years, director of the Bank of England, Olympic rower, and chancellor of Aston University
 Sir Dominic Cadbury (born 1940), businessman, Chancellor of the University of Birmingham
 Sir Egbert Cadbury (1893–1967), First World War fighter pilot and later managing director of the family firm
Peter Cadbury (1918–2006), entrepreneur

 Richard Cadbury Barrow (1827-1894), merchant

References 

Cadbury
Quaker families